Kirill Nikolayevich Kotov (born 9 February 1983) is a Russian professional football official and a former player.

Club career
He made his Russian Football National League debut for FC Arsenal Tula on 31 March 2004 in a game against FC Sokol Saratov. He played two more seasons in the FNL for FC MVD Rossii Moscow and FC Dynamo Saint Petersburg.

External links
 

1983 births
Footballers from Moscow
Living people
Russian footballers
Association football midfielders
FC Zhemchuzhina Sochi players
FC Vityaz Podolsk players
FC Arsenal Tula players
FC Saturn Ramenskoye players
FC Anzhi Makhachkala players
FC Dynamo Saint Petersburg players
FC MVD Rossii Moscow players
FC Dynamo Makhachkala players